Nataliya Yuryevna Golts (also Natalia Golts, ; born August 22, 1985, in Monchegorsk, Murmansk Oblast) is an amateur Russian freestyle wrestler, who played for the women's lightweight category. Since 2002, Golts had won a total of five medals (one silver and four bronze) for the 51, 55 and 59 kg classes at the World Wrestling Championships. She is also a five-time European wrestling champion (2003, 2005–2008), a silver medalist at the 2010 European Wrestling Championships in Baku, Azerbaijan, and a member of Russian Army Sports Club in Moscow, under her personal coach Omar Murtasaliev.

Golts represented Russia at the 2008 Summer Olympics in Beijing, where she competed for the women's 55 kg class. She defeated Azerbaijan's Yelena Komarova in the preliminary round of sixteen, before losing out the quarterfinal match to Japanese wrestler and defending Olympic champion Saori Yoshida, who was able to score six points in two straight periods, leaving Golts with a single point. Because her opponent advanced further into the final match, Golts offered another shot for the bronze medal by entering the repechage bouts. Unfortunately, she was defeated in the first round by Sweden's Ida-Theres Nerell, with a three-set technical score (1–0, 0–3, 1–0), and a classification point score of 1–3.

References

External links
Profile – International Wrestling Database
NBC 2008 Olympics profile

1985 births
Living people
People from Monchegorsk
Russian female sport wrestlers
Olympic wrestlers of Russia
Wrestlers at the 2008 Summer Olympics
World Wrestling Championships medalists
Sportspeople from Murmansk Oblast
21st-century Russian women
20th-century Russian women